Jovo Pavlović (born 16 August 1989) in Melbourne is an Australian-Serbian football player who is currently playing for Stirling Lions. He previously played for Mitra Kukar in Indonesia Super League, and Hong Kong First Division League club South China.

References

External links
JOVO PAVLOVIC at Liga Indonesia

1989 births
Living people
Australian soccer players
Australian expatriate soccer players
Australian expatriate sportspeople in Indonesia
Expatriate footballers in Indonesia
Liga 1 (Indonesia) players
Mitra Kukar players
Australian people of Serbian descent
Hong Kong First Division League players
Australian expatriate sportspeople in Hong Kong
South China AA players
FK Borac Banja Luka players
Expatriate footballers in Bosnia and Herzegovina
Soccer players from Melbourne
Association football defenders
Australian expatriate sportspeople in Bosnia and Herzegovina
Stirling Macedonia FC players
Inglewood United FC players
Floreat Athena FC players